Marist Sisters' College, Woolwich is an independent Catholic single-sex secondary day school for girls, located in Woolwich, a Lower North Shore suburb of Sydney, New South Wales, Australia. It was established in 1908 by the Marist Sisters and has a non-selective enrolment policy which caters for approximately 1,000 students from Year 7 to Year 12.

House system
There are six houses, all of which are named after famous Marists:
Chanel - Red - named after St Peter Chanel
Chavoin - Blue - named after Jeanne-Marie Chavoin
Colin - White - named after Jean Claude Colin
Jaricot - Magenta - named after Pauline Jaricot
Marcellin - Green - named after St Marcellin Champagnat
Perroton - Yellow - named after Françoise Perroton

Curriculum
The curriculum at Marist Sisters' College is broken up into Religious Education and 8 Key Learning Areas (KLA's). The Key Learning Areas are: English,  Mathematics,  Science, HSIE (Human Society and its Environment), Creative Arts, Languages, TAS (Technical and Applied Science) and PDHPE (Personal Development, Health and Physical Education). Marist Sisters' College also offers courses in VET (Vocational Education Training).

Outlined below are the specific courses for the Junior and Senior years. Syllabuses for all these courses can be found at the Board of Studies website.

Junior Courses – Year 7 – 10
Religious Education, Computing Studies, Commerce, Dance, Design and Technology, Digital Media, Drama, English, Food Technology, Geography, History, Languages (French and Italian), Mathematics, Music, PD/H/PE, Science, Sport, Textiles and Design, Visual Arts.

Senior Courses – Years 11 – 12
Religious Education, Ancient History, Biology, Business Services, Business Studies, Chemistry, Community and Family Studies, Dance, Design and Technology, Drama, Earth and Environmental Science, Economics, English, Entertainment, Food Technology, Geography, Information Processing and Technology, Languages, Legal Studies, Life Management, General Maths, Mathematics, Music, Modern History, PDHPE, Physics, Senior Science, Software Design and Development, Studies of Religion (1 and 2 units), Textiles and Design, Visual Arts, Office Skills.

Notable alumnae  
Courtney Miller-Actress (Plays Bella Nixon in Home and Away)

See also 

 List of Catholic schools in New South Wales
 Catholic education in Australia

References

1908 establishments in Australia
Association of Marist Schools of Australia
Educational institutions established in 1908
Girls' schools in New South Wales
Catholic secondary schools in Sydney
Woolwich, New South Wales
Roman Catholic Archdiocese of Sydney
Alliance of Girls' Schools Australasia